Mokrovo is a rural locality (a village) in Chertkovskoye Rural Settlement, Selivanovsky District, Vladimir Oblast, Russia. The population was 1 as of 2010.

Geography 
Mokrovo is located on the Tetrukh River, 27 km northeast from Krasnaya Gorbatka (the district's administrative centre) by road. Goritsy is the nearest rural locality.

References 

Rural localities in Selivanovsky District